Sotnikovo is a rural locality (a selo) in Ivolginsky District, Republic of Buryatia, Russia. The population was 6,274 as of 2010. There are 335 streets.

Geography 
Sotnikovo is located 28 km northeast of Ivolginsk (the district's administrative centre) by road. Zarechny is the nearest rural locality.

References 

Rural localities in Ivolginsky District